The Bournda National Park is a  protected area in New South Wales, Australia, managed as a national park by NSW National Parks and Wildlife Service, and was established on 24 April 1992.  It forms part of the Ulladulla to Merimbula Important Bird Area, identified as such by BirdLife International because of its importance for swift parrots.

Description
The park is 343 km south of Sydney near Tathra. Bournda National Park spans from Kianinny Bay, on the southern side of Tathra, south for about 13 km. There is a good walking track, along the coast for most of its length.

The park is host to three main bodies of water. Wallagoot Lake is a large salt water lake that last opened up to the ocean in June 2008. Bondi Lake is of ecological significance as it is the closest fresh water lake to the ocean in the region. Finally, Bournda Lagoon is a brackish (half salt water / half fresh water) lagoon that is periodically open to the ocean. The lagoon is a popular swimming spot for locals and campers alike.  Good camping facilities are available at the Hobart Beach camp ground.

The park was once a State Recreation Area and became a National Park in 1992. Adjacent to the park is the Bournda Nature Reserve, which was established in 1972 and is 6,088 ha in size. Both areas are included in the management plan by the National Parks and Wildlife Service.

Walking tracks
 Hobart Beach to Bournda Lagoon - 2.6 km
 Hobart Beach to Scotts Bay - 1.3 km
 Hobart Beach to Tathra via the Kangarutha Track - 12.0 km
 Bournda Lagoon round trip via Bournda Island - 6.0 km

See also
 Protected areas of New South Wales

References

External links
 Bournda National Park website
 Bournda National Park and Bournda Reserve Final Plan of Management 2000

National parks of New South Wales
South Coast (New South Wales)
Protected areas established in 1947
1947 establishments in Australia
Important Bird Areas of New South Wales